Sattleria marguareisi is a moth in the family Gelechiidae. It was described by Peter Huemer and Klaus Siegfried Oskar Sattler in 1992. It is found in the Alpes-Maritimes of France.

References

Sattleria
Moths described in 1992